Eddy Joe Cotton (real name Zebu Recchia) is the author of Hobo: A Young Man’s Thoughts on Trains and Tramping in America, which made it to the Denver Post best-seller list. Cotton wrote the book about the first three weeks of tramping at age 19 after leaving his father's home in Denver, Colorado. Cotton is also the ringleader and hobo poet of the Yard Dogs Road Show.

Quotes
"If you don't have a blanket you can stuff newspaper in your clothes and it'll act as insulation."

"So there goes all that truth changing again and there we go looking into the neon horizon with sunset eyes—hoping for the best and sharing all the rest."

External links
 Eddy Joe Cotton Homepage
 Yard Dogs Road Show
 Hobo at Random House
 Review of Hobo at The Westword

Year of birth missing (living people)
Living people
American essayists
American memoirists
American male poets
American poets
Writers from Denver
Hoboes
American male essayists